The 2017 Liga 3 Papua (also known as Piala Gubernur Papua 2017) is the third edition of Liga 3 Papua as a qualifying round for the national round of 2017 Liga 3. Persintan Intan Jaya are the defending champions.

The competition scheduled starts on 24 May 2017.

Teams
There are 19 clubs which will participate the league in this season.

First stage

Group A

Group B

Group C

Second stage

References 

2017 in Indonesian football
Sport in Papua (province)